Martiguesia is a genus of agglutinated benthic forams from the Upper Cretaceous (Santonian) of France. The test is free, the early stage planispirally coiled, becoming nearly straight during later growth. The agglutinated wall is externally imperforate, the interior with a coarse alveolar network. Chambers are subdivided and almost completely filled by irregular radial pillars. The aperture, cribrate.

As a member of the Spirocyclinidae Martiguesia is related to  Haurania, Anchispirocyclina, Streptocyclammina, and of course Spirocyclina.

References

 Alfred R. Loeblich, jr & Helen Tappan 1964. Sarcodina, Chiefly "Thecamoebians" and Foraminiferida. Treatise on Invertebrate Paleontology, Part C, Protista 2.  Geological Society of America and University of Kansas Press. 
 A.R. Loeblich & H Tappan, 1988,  in GSI.ir Paleontology,  
 Rotaliata, Textulariana  https://web.archive.org/web/20151222074257/http://www.foraminifera.eu/rotaliatatex.php

Loftusiida
Prehistoric Foraminifera genera